Jeanes is a surname, and may refer to:

 Allene Jeanes (1906–1995), American chemical researcher
 Anna T. Jeanes (1822–1907), American philanthropist
 David Jeanes (born 1943), English former rugby player
 Susan Jeanes (born 1958), Australian politician
 Tex Jeanes (1900–1973), American baseball player